Nate Washington (born August 28, 1983) is a former American football wide receiver. He was signed by the Pittsburgh Steelers as an undrafted free agent in 2005 and played on two Super Bowl-winning teams during four seasons with the Steelers. He then played six seasons for the Tennessee Titans before playing his eleventh and final season for the Houston Texans.

Early life
Washington was raised in Toledo by his single mother, Lisha Washington. Nate attended Scott High School in Toledo, Ohio, where he was named first-team all-area and honorable mention all-state as a senior.

College career
Washington played college football at Tiffin University in Tiffin, Ohio, where he majored in Information Systems. He holds eight individual Dragons' receiving records, including records for receptions in a game (13), yards in a game (299), receptions in a season (70), yards in a season (1,428), touchdowns in a season (16), career receptions (212), career yards (4,214), and career touchdown receptions (47).

Professional career

Pittsburgh Steelers
Signing with the Pittsburgh Steelers as an undrafted free agent in 2005, Washington became the first Tiffin University player in the modern era to play in the NFL. His first career reception came in the 2005 AFC Championship Game against the Denver Broncos.

He was the Steelers' slot receiver throughout the 2006 season, and started two games after injuries to Hines Ward.

A restricted free agent in the 2008 offseason, Washington resigned a one-year, $1.417 million tender offer on April 16, 2008. In Super Bowl XLIII, Washington had one catch for 11 yards on his way to winning his second career Super Bowl ring.

Tennessee Titans
Washington signed a six-year, $27 million deal with the Tennessee Titans on March 2, 2009.

In the 2011 season, Titans top receiver Kenny Britt tore his medial collateral ligament (MCL) and anterior cruciate ligament (ACL) in the third game against the Denver Broncos, leaving Washington as the number one receiver. Washington finished the year with career highs in receptions (74), yards (1,023), and touchdowns (7) as the Titans finished 9-7, missing the playoffs due to a tiebreaker with the Cincinnati Bengals.

In the 2012 season, the offense as a whole struggled to find any rhythm with quarterback Jake Locker suffering a shoulder injury that affected his play all year and running back Chris Johnson getting off to a slow start. Washington finished the year with a team-leading 746 receiving yards and 4 touchdowns, including a 71-yard touchdown catch from Locker in week 3 against the Detroit Lions.

For the 2013 season, Washington was elected a team captain. In a week 3 game against the San Diego Chargers, he emerged as Locker's favorite target. With the Titans trailing, Washington reportedly led the team in a rally using references from the film 300. With roughly two minutes left on the clock, Washington helped drive the ball 94 yards which resulted in a touchdown pass with 15 seconds left in the game. The Titans won their home opener 20-17 with Washington contributing eight catches for 131 yards. For the season, Washington totaled 58 receptions for 919 yards and three touchdowns.

Through the 2013 season, Washington ranked third among all active undrafted NFL players in career receiving yards behind only Wes Welker and Antonio Gates. He also ranked first among all NFL wide receivers in consecutive games played with 128.

In 2014, in a week 11 game, Washington caught an 80-yard touchdown pass from quarterback Zach Mettenberger against his old team, the Steelers.

Houston Texans
Washington signed a one-year, $1 million deal with the Houston Texans on April 1, 2015.

New England Patriots
Washington signed with the New England Patriots on March 24, 2016. On August 24, 2016, the Patriots released Washington.

Personal life
Washington has two daughters with ex wife Monique Johnson  He gives back to his hometown of Toledo through several charities as well as charity fundraisers that he has founded, along with hosting an annual football camp.

His mother, Lisha, eventually earned an associate degree from the University of Toledo and in 2010 was honored by the nonprofit Mom's House of Toledo. She is a secretary for the Lucas County Board of Developmental Disabilities.

References

External links

Tennessee Titans bio 
Houston Texans bio 
New England Patriots bio

1983 births
Living people
Sportspeople from Toledo, Ohio
Players of American football from Ohio
African-American players of American football
American football wide receivers
Tiffin Dragons football players
Pittsburgh Steelers players
Tennessee Titans players
Houston Texans players
New England Patriots players
21st-century African-American sportspeople
20th-century African-American people